Paolo Brozzi (17th-century) was an Italian painter, born and trained in Bologna, and active painting quadrature in Genoa and Rome in the second half of the 17th century.

References
Delle vite de' pittori, scultori ed architetti genovesi By Raffaele Soprani, Carlo Giuseppe Ratti, page 345.

Year of birth unknown
Year of death unknown
17th-century Italian painters
Italian male painters
Painters from Genoa
Painters from Bologna
Quadratura painters
Italian Baroque painters